The 2016–17 Saint Francis Red Flash men's basketball team represented Saint Francis University during the 2016–17 NCAA Division I men's basketball season. The Red Flash, led by fifth-year head coach Rob Krimmel, played their home games at the DeGol Arena in Loretto, Pennsylvania as members of the Northeast Conference. They finished the season 17–17, 11–7 in NEC play to finish in a tie for third place. They defeated Bryant and Wagner to advance to the Championship game of the NEC tournament where they lost to Mount St. Mary's. They were invited to the CollegeInsider.com Tournament where they defeated Jacksonville in the first round to win the Hugh Durham Classic. However, they lost in the second round to UMBC.

Previous season
The Red Flash finished the 2015–16 season 13–17, 9–9 in NEC play to finish in a tie for sixth place. They lost in the quarterfinals of the NEC tournament to Fairleigh Dickinson.

Roster

Schedule and results

|-
!colspan=9 style=| Non-conference regular season

 

|-
!colspan=9 style=| NEC regular season

|-
!colspan=9 style=| NEC tournament

|-
!colspan=9 style=| CIT

References

Saint Francis Red Flash men's basketball seasons
Saint Francis (PA)
Saint Francis (PA)
Saint Francis
Saint Francis